Proptisht is a village and a former municipality in the Korçë County, southeastern Albania. At the 2015 local government reform it became a subdivision of the municipality Pogradec. The population at the 2011 census was 4,785. The municipal unit consists of the villages Proptisht, Rodokal Sipër, Rodokal Poshtë, Homezh, Slabinjë, Somotinë, Kriçkovë, Selcë e Poshtme, Homçan, Vërri, Golik, Slatinë, Baribardhë, Selishtë and Zalltore.

References

Former municipalities in Korçë County
Administrative units of Pogradec
Villages in Korçë County